Cine Sony was an Italian free-to-air television channel owned by Sony Pictures Television.

The channel launched on 7 September 2017 and closed on 11 July 2019 after Sony Pictures Television sold off it and sister channel Pop's slots to Mediaset. Cine Sony's former slot would be used to launch a temporary channel called Mediaset Extra 2.

Programming
Owned by the Sony Pictures Television subsidiary of Sony Corporation, its programming consisted of documentaries, films,  TV Series and shows produced from Sony Pictures Entertainment. The channel included contents from Columbia Pictures, TriStar Pictures and Sony Pictures Classics.
Cine Classic: la storia di Hollywood
Donne da oscar
I migori registri di Hollywood
La fabbrica dei sogni: storia e volti del cinema italiano
Ultimate Countdown: CineClassifica
Vite da star

Film
 Captain Philips
 Walk the Line
 Hollow Man

See also
Television in Italy
List of Sony Pictures Television series
Sony Pictures Networks

References

External links
 Official website

Italian-language television networks
Sony Pictures Television
Sony Pictures Entertainment
Television channels and stations established in 2017
Television channels and stations disestablished in 2019